Charles K. Monfort (born October 30, 1959) and Richard L. Monfort (born April 27, 1954) are the primary owners of the Colorado Rockies Major League Baseball team. Both grew up in Greeley, Colorado and are sons to Kenneth Monfort; previous owner of Monfort of Colorado, Inc. a meatpacking and distributing company that was acquired by ConAgra Foods in 1987.  Dick Monfort is managing general partner, chairman and chief executive officer, while Charlie Monfort is the team's other general partner and vice chairman.

Dick Monfort
Dick Monfort was the first born of the two Monfort brothers. Dick graduated from the University of Northern Colorado, Greeley in 1976 with a bachelor's degree in Business Management. He joined Monfort of Colorado in 1974 as a cattle buyer. He then served as vice president federal cattle procurement from 1979–81, group vice president of cattle products 1983-1984 and executive vice president 1984-1987.  When ConAgra bought Monfort of Colorado in 1987, Dick became president of ConAgra Red Meats. Dick also owns shares in the Hyatt Regency Indian Wells Resort and Spa in Indian Wells, California, the Hilltop Steak House in Boston, and other real estate ventures in Colorado. At the University of Northern Colorado, Dick serves on the board of trustees along with the board of directors at University of Colorado Hospital, Denver Zoo, and the Colorado Economic Development Board. Dick now resides in Denver, Colorado with his wife Karen.

Charlie Monfort
Charlie Monfort graduated from the University of Utah in 1982 with a bachelor's degree in Marketing and Business Management where he served as president of the Kappa Sigma fraternity, succeeded by Eddie Hillard. Charlie started working for the family business Monfort of Colorado, Inc. also in 1988 as president of International Sales until 1996. In 1996, Charlie became president of ConAgra Foods International; later leaving in 1998 to concentrate on his previous commitment to the Rockies. Charlie also serves on the board of trustees at Colorado Mesa University, (formerly Mesa State College); Grand Junction, Colorado. All along with being a board member of the Kempe Foundation, the Special Olympics, and the Monfort Family Foundation. Charlie has son Kenny, daughter Ciara, son Lucas, daughter Danica and stepson Brenden.

Colorado Rockies affiliations
On September 2, 1992, Jerry McMorris welcomed Charlie Monfort and Oren Benton to join him in buying controlling interest in the Rockies.  This came after founding owner Mickey Monus was ensnared in a massive accounting scandal surrounding his Phar-Mor discount drugstores.
Dick Monfort later replaced Benton in the ownership group, and became vice chairman of the Rockies on December 8, 1997. On March 31, 2003, Charlie was named CEO of the Colorado Rockies, succeeding president Keli McGregor who had taken the role from McMorris in 2001.
In 2005, Dick and Charlie Monfort purchased McMorris’ financial interest in the team, becoming the primary owners.  Charlie remained as managing general partner, chairman and CEO until 2011, when he handed both roles to Dick.

References

Living people
Colorado Rockies owners
Major League Baseball owners
Business duos
Sibling duos
Year of birth missing (living people)